Cities of Gold is the debut album by Australian band Lost Valentinos, released on 9 September 2009 in Australia by etcetc.

Track listing
 "Midnights" – 3:37
 "In The City Of Gold" – 2:31
 "Serio" – 4:00
 "Francisco (Y Los Trece De La Fama)" – 5:06
 "The Bismarck" – 4:11
 "Thief" – 3:56
 "Between The Squalls" – 2:27
 "Nightmoves" – 4:28
 "Dark That I Love" – 3:59
 "Great Leap Forward" – 3:54
 "Happiness Made Easy" – 4:20

2009 debut albums